{{Speciesbox
| image = 
| image_caption =
| taxon = Phyllonorycter epichares| authority =  (Meyrick, 1928)
| synonyms =
}}Phyllonorycter epichares is a moth of the family Gracillariidae. It is known from Assam, India.

The larvae feed on Malus species, including Malus pumila''. They probably mine the leaves of their host plant.

References

epichares
Moths of Asia
Moths described in 1928